Razom (Ukrainian: Разом) is a non-profit Ukrainian-American human rights organization established in 2014 to support the people of Ukraine. Razom means "together" in Ukrainian. Its main goals are increasing civic engagement within Ukraine and engaging the voices of Ukrainians around the world. The organization uses social networking tools to reunite the global network of individuals in coordinating effort supporting shared goals.

History 
 Dec. 2013 Established the private Facebook group Ukrainians Abroad for Euromaidan (now, over 3500 members)
 Jan. 2014 Board of Directors established and Razom registered as a non-profit incorporated entity
 Feb. 2014 Established the public Facebook page Razom For Ukraine (now, over 12500 followers)

Razom's activity started in the late 2013, when Ukrainians in New York City and Washington, DC, were gathering at the impromptu demonstrations to show support for the Ukrainians during the Ukrainian Revolution of Dignity, which turned into a fight against then-President of Ukraine Viktor Yanukovych. The main goal of such demonstrations was to bring the Obama administration's attention to the events taking place in Ukraine.

Soon it became clear that the Ukrainian Diaspora of approximately 900,000 people throughout the U.S. could and wished to do more than demonstrations, which required establishing a legal entity. Thus, the community organization Razom for Ukraine (Together for Ukraine) was established. With a core group of about ten volunteers, it unites various Ukrainian activists throughout the U.S. and maintains a global network of over 2,000 people of diverse background - doctors, engineers, educators, as well as legal and financial professionals.

Mission 
To foster Ukrainian democracy and civil society through a global network of experts and organizations supporting democracy activists and human rights advocates throughout Ukraine.

Razom's main activity is divided into 6 initiatives, a different number of projects and programs are implemented annually. The description and their results can be found at the Razom website.

Board of directors 
 President, Marketing Director – Mariya Soroka
 Vice President, Operations Director – Natalia Shyrba
 Secretary – Olya Yarychkivska

Legal Report "The Crisis in Ukraine: Its Legal Dimensions" 
On April 14, 2014, a team of international lawyers released its Report, "Crisis in Ukraine: Its Legal Dimensions," and recommendations on the ongoing crisis and armed conflict in Ukraine. Prepared for Razom, the report by a team of highly trained international lawyers outlined legal conclusions on Eastern Ukraine; the annexation of Crimea; the Budapest Memorandum on international security guarantees; and the human rights and humanitarian law at issue.

The international team prepared their Report as pro bono service while studying at NYU School of Law. The 76-page Report covers the critical legal aspects of the conflict. Ivanna Bilych, Razom General Counsel, said, "This is a must-read Report for policymakers. It spells out, in one place, the law you need to know to understand the crisis." Lidiya Dukhovich, Esq., Director of the Institute of Modern Russia, added, "Armed conflict between Russia and Ukraine is a tragedy. The Report explains the legal stakes, but no Report can explain adequately the terrifying human stakes for both Russia and Ukraine."

The Report, with citations, covers the right of secession; crimes of aggression; critical energy security issues; sanctions imposed to date; and military law. Ambassador Sergeyev, the Razom Organization and the international team of legal scholars that put together this document, encourage all people to access the white paper and ensure that they keep being actively informed.

The report can be viewed online.

Notes

External links 
razomforukraine.org - official website

 http://www.newstimes.com/news/us/article/Ukrainians-in-US-Canada-urge-protester-support-5248271.php

 http://www.novagazeta.info/archives_pdf/2014/ng_267.pdf

References 

Human rights organizations based in the United States
International human rights organizations
Politics of Ukraine

See also 
Nova Ukraine
U24
Come Back Alive